Kiss and Cry is a 2017 Canadian biopic directed by Sean Cisterna. The film depicts the life of Carley Allison who suffered from a rare form of cancer. It was filmed at various real locations, such as Carley’s house and bedroom, skating rink, classrooms and hospitals in Toronto.

The film stars Carley’s real-life friend Sarah Fisher. Throughout the film, Fisher breaks the fourth wall, using the very words from the real Allison’s blog posts and You Tube performances. The letter Carley writes and addresses to “cancer” is also partly her actual words.

It was released on February 10, 2017 and has been rated as a 6.8 out of 10.

Plot
Carley Elle Allison (Sarah Fisher) is a 17-year-old competitive figure skater in Toronto. Her motto is, always smile / find a reason to be happy. She has a lot going for her: she’s working to gain a place on Canada’s national team, and gaining momentum, she enjoys singing, has a great family and friends and at a party, she meets John, a handsome and sweet guy (Luke Bilyk) from her biology class.

Just as things seem they couldn't get any better, they get worse. Carley starts to feel sick, she begins to experience a severe shortage of breath, which is initially dismissed as asthma. The inhaler she is prescribed doesn’t fix her difficulty breathing, so a doctor runs some tests. After collapsing on a date with John, she's taken to the hospital, where doctors find a rare form of cancerous tumor (melanoma), outside her trachea. Determined to beat the illness, Carly first undergoes tracheal surgery and weeks later, chemotherapy.

Carley deals with "this little set back in my life” with a positive view always. Her family can find humor while changing a tracheostomy tube. One day, when John stays at her parents’ to make dinner, she loses a lock of hair. She warns him it will only get worse and if he decides to stay, he must stay positive. He declares his love for her.

Some days later, we see Carley doing her vlog bald, and directly afterwards John asks her to the prom outside her window with a drum set. She takes him to the rink to teach him to skate. As they are leaving, she bumps into two of her former skating teammates and gets rebuffed by one of them. Selena Gomez gives her encouragement on her Youtube video soon after.

Once  back at school, she is welcomed back with many messages of love and encouragement. And then she comes across a fundraising event for cancer research, haircuts for cancer. She does a television interview, where she puts forth her mentality to treat cancer like a contact  sport, to keep moving so it can’t get her. John and Carley go to the prom together, and are intimate for the first time.

Time passes, we see Carley’s hair is coming  back. She’s had the tumor removed, and is told so far, so good. She goes back to skating some months later. She is offered to sing ‘O Canada’ to open a televised NHL game. John brings his Greek family to her house for dinner.

Months later Carley's rediagnosed with extremely rare Clear Cell Sarcoma in her lungs.  John and Carley reaffirm their love for one another, but she succumbs to the disease later on that year at 19. Carley’s Angels Foundation was founded in her honor to help with covering high medical costs.

Cast
 Sarah Fisher - Carley Allison
 Luke Bilyk - John Servinis
 Sergio Di Zio - Mark Allison
 Chantal Kreviazuk - May Allison
 Zoë Belkin - Rebecca
 Naomi Snieckus - Sophie Wexner
 Denis Akiyama - Shin Amano

References

External links 

2017 films
2017 drama films
2010s biographical films
Canadian drama films
Canadian biographical films
English-language Canadian films
Films directed by Sean Cisterna
2010s English-language films
2010s Canadian films